The 1996 United States presidential election in Florida took place on November 5, 1996, as part of the 1996 United States presidential election. Voters chose twenty-five representatives, or electors to the Electoral College, who voted for president and vice president. Florida was won by President Bill Clinton (D) over Senator Bob Dole (R-KS), with Clinton winning 48.02% to 42.32% by a margin of 5.7%. Billionaire businessman Ross Perot (Reform-TX) finished in third, with 9.12% of the popular vote.

, this is the last election in which Calhoun County, Dixie County, Gilchrist County, Franklin County, Glades County, Gulf County, Hamilton County, Hendry County, Levy County, Madison County, Okeechobee County, Putnam County, Sumter County, Taylor County, Wakulla County, and Citrus County voted for a Democratic presidential candidate and the last election in which Orange County voted for a Republican presidential candidate.

Results

Results by county

References

Florida
1996
1996 Florida elections